"Pranava Veda" may be:
following the Bhagavata Purana (9.14.48), the notion that in a primeval state, "Om was the Veda"  
allegedly, a "fifth Veda" followed by the Vishwakarma (caste)
a notion of an "original Veda" of Mamuni Mayan
a misspelling for Pranava-Vāda